Solariella segersi is a species of sea snail, a marine gastropod mollusk in the family Solariellidae.

Description

Distribution

References

External links
 Williams S.T., Smith L.M., Herbert D.G., Marshall B.A., Warén A., Kiel S., Dyal P., Linse K., Vilvens C. & Kano Y. (2013) Cenozoic climate change and diversification on the continental shelf and slope: evolution of gastropod diversity in the family Solariellidae (Trochoidea). Ecology and Evolution 3(4): 887–917
 Helwerda, R. A.; Wesselingh, F.; Williams, S. T. (2014). On some Vetigastropoda (Mollusca, Gastropoda) from the Plio-Pleistocene of the Philippines with descriptions of three new species. Zootaxa. 3755(2): 101-135

segersi
Gastropods described in 2006